The Lewis Range is a small mountain range in southwestern British Columbia, Canada, located north of Mereworth Sound. It has an area of 52 km2 and is a subrange of the Pacific Ranges which in turn form part of the Coast Mountains.

See also
List of mountain ranges

References

Pacific Ranges